The blue-cheeked bee-eater (Merops persicus) is a near passerine bird in the bee-eater family, Meropidae. The genus name Merops is Ancient Greek for "bee-eater", and persicus is Latin for "Persian".

It breeds in Northern Africa, and the Middle East from eastern Turkey to Kazakhstan and India. It is generally strongly migratory, wintering in tropical Africa, although some populations breed and live year-round in the Sahel.  This species occurs as a rare vagrant north of its breeding range, with most vagrants occurring in Italy and Greece.

Taxonomy and systematics
Two subspecies are recognized:

Merops persicus persicus - Breeds in Asia, winters in East and Southern Africa.
Merops persicus chrysocercus - Breeds in North Africa, winters in West Africa.

This species is closely related to blue-tailed bee-eater, M. philippinus of East Asia, and the olive bee-eater of Africa, and has been treated as being the same species (conspecific).

Description
This species, like other bee-eaters, is a richly coloured, slender bird. It is predominantly green; its face has blue sides with a black eye stripe,  and a yellow and brown throat; the beak is black. Sexes are mostly alike but the tail-streamers of the female are shorter.

This is a bird which breeds in sub-tropical semi-desert with a few trees, such as acacia. It winters in open woodland or grassland. As the name suggests, bee-eaters predominantly eat  insects, especially bees, wasps and  hornets, which are caught in the air by sorties from an open perch.  However, this species probably takes more dragonflies than any other food item. Its preferred hunting perch is telephone wires if available.

Blue-cheeked bee-eaters may nest solitarily or in loose colonies of up to ten birds. They may also nest in colonies with European bee-eaters. The nests are located in sandy banks, embankments, low cliffs or on the shore of the Caspian Sea. Both the male and the female take care of the eggs, although the female alone incubates them at night. Incubation takes 23–26 days.

The call sounds 'flatter' and less 'fluty' than the European bee-eater.

References

External links
 Blue-cheeked bee-eater - Species text in The Atlas of Southern African Birds.

blue-cheeked bee-eater
Birds of North Africa
Birds of West Africa
Birds of Central Asia
Birds of Western Asia
Birds of Afghanistan
Birds of Pakistan
Birds of Africa
blue-cheeked bee-eater
Articles containing video clips